Joseph Evarist Seyire was a Ghanaian politician and member of the first parliament of the second republic of Ghana representing Navrongo constituency under the membership of the Progress Party (PP).

Early life and education 
Seyire was born on 25 July 1942 in the Upper East region of Ghana. He attended Catholic Teacher Training College, Navrongo now St. Joseph's College of Education where he obtained his Teachers' Training Certificate. He was a businessman before going into parliament.

Politics 
Seyire began his political career in 1969 when he became the parliamentary candidate for the Progress Party (PP) to represent the Bolgatanga constituency prior to the commencement of the 1969 Ghanaian parliamentary election. He assumed office as a member of the first parliament of the second republic of Ghana on 1 October 1969 after being a pronounced winner at the 1969 Ghanaian parliamentary election. His tenure ended on 13 January 1972.

Personal life 
Seyire is a Christian.

References 

1942 births
People from Upper East Region
Ghanaian MPs 1969–1972
Progress Party (Ghana) politicians
Living people
Ghanaian Christians